Happy Days (translit. Schastlivye dni) is a 1991 Soviet drama film directed by Aleksei Balabanov. It was Balabanov's feature film debut. It was screened in the Un Certain Regard section at the 1992 Cannes Film Festival.

Cast
 Viktor Sukhorukov
 Anzhelika Nevolina
 Yevgeni Merkuryev
 Georgi Tejkh
 Nikolai Lavrov

References

External links

1991 films
1990s Russian-language films
1991 drama films
Films directed by Aleksei Balabanov
Soviet black-and-white films
Samuel Beckett